The Writers Guild Award for Best Written Film Concerning American Scene was an award presented from 1949 to 1952 by the Writers Guild of America, after which it was discontinued.

Winners & Nominees

Notes 

 The year indicates when the film was released. The awards are presented the following year.

References

External links 

 WGA.org

Writers Guild of America Awards
Awards established in 1949
1949 establishments in the United States
Awards disestablished in 1952
1952 disestablishments in the United States